Hemipsocus chloroticus is a species of leaf litter barklouse in the family Hemipsocidae. It is found in Africa, Central America, North America, Oceania, and Southern Asia.

References

Psocetae
Articles created by Qbugbot
Insects described in 1858